"The Fresh Prince Project" is the pilot episode of the television series The Fresh Prince of Bel-Air. It premiered on NBC in the United States on September 10, 1990. It guest-stars John Petlock and Helen Page Camp as Henry and Margaret Furth. Tatyana Ali was auditioned in New York City for Quincy Jones to play Ashley when she was 11 years old. This episode was followed by "Bang the Drum, Ashley".

Plot summary
Street-smart teenager Will Smith is living in West Philadelphia with his mother Viola. After he gets into a fight with a bully named Omar Phelps following a missed streetball shot that misses the rim and hits Omar's gang, he is sent to live with his wealthy relatives in Bel-Air, the Banks family, so he can learn about discipline and hard work in a safe place.

The series picks up right where the opening credits leave off, after the taxi drops Will off at the Banks residence. When he arrives, the mansion door is opened by the Banks' butler Geoffrey. Will first thinks Geoffrey is his uncle Phil, but Geoffrey tells him otherwise. When the Banks arrive at their home, Will's aunt Vivian is very happy to see Will. Phil is also happy at first, but is upset by his attire and use of slang.

After saying hello to his cousins Hilary and Ashley, Will goes to his room to make himself comfortable. After a while, Geoffrey comes in with a tuxedo. He tells Will that Philip has invited several of his colleagues from his law firm to dinner and didn't know about Will being sent to live in Bel-Air when he extended the invitation. When Geoffrey leaves, Ashley enters the room. Will and Ashley quickly make a connection, and he teaches her how to rap. As she leaves the room, Philip enters with Will's cousin Carlton. Will doesn't recognize him at first, but after Philip tells him it's Carlton, he starts to make jokes at Carlton's expense. After being told to just do what Carlton does at dinner and witnessing his cousin's preppy behavior, he imagines seeing himself dressed like Carlton in the mirror and screams in terror.

When Will comes downstairs to dinner, he is wearing his cap, a tuxedo,  a colorful shirt, a waist cover chest level, tuxedo pants, and sneakers. When Philip sees this, he is very embarrassed, but reluctantly introduces Will to his colleagues. Will behaves as he normally does, further embarrassing Philip. When they are sitting at the dinner table, Philip gets more and more furious, first because of Will beat-boxing and rhythmically drumming on glasses with a fork, and later when he asks Ashley to say grace; she obliges, but raps grace instead of offering a spoken grace. After the dinner party, Philip decides to have a talk with Will. Will says that Philip does not know how life is on the streets, but Philip objects, telling him that he grew up on the streets of Baltimore. He references Will saying at the beginning of the episode that Malcolm X was his hero, complimenting his Malcolm X poster and saying he heard him speak. Philip makes to leave the living room, but stops and smiles at Will when he sees and hears him play a few bars of Beethoven's "Für Elise" on the piano.

Later that night, Ashley is in her room dancing to Will's walkman. Will enters and begins dancing behind her until she spots him. They then head out to look  for a bathroom. Ashley tells Will that she is very happy that he is living here, and says he is like the big brother she never had. Will, however, tries to remind her of Carlton, but quickly brushes it aside, saying she has a point. They discover that the first two bathrooms they try to enter are occupied by a singing Carlton and a gargling Hilary, respectively. When Will and Ashley knock at the door to the bathroom that Hilary is in, she tells them to go away because she is trying to remove her makeup. They pretend to go away, but they hide behind a nearby wall. When Hillary opens the door and looks out, she has a towel wrapped around her head and is wearing a bathrobe and a facial scrub mask. Will jumps out and screams "I knew it!".

Cast
 Will Smith as Will Smith
 James Avery as Philip Banks
 Janet Hubert as Vivian Banks
 Alfonso Ribiero as Carlton Banks
 Karyn Parsons as Hilary Banks
 Tatyana M. Ali as Ashley Banks
 Joseph Marcell as Geoffrey Butler
 Helen Page Camp as Margaret Furth
 John Petlock as Henry Furth

References

External links
 
 

1990 American television episodes
American television series premieres
The Fresh Prince of Bel-Air